Sarah Elsworthy (born 29 May 1998) is an Australian professional basketball player. She currently plays for the Adelaide Lightning in the WNBL.

Career

WNBL
Elsworthy started her WNBL career at a young age, with a young Adelaide Lightning side for the 2016–17 season. She is playing alongside Olympian and previous WNBA player Laura Hodges. Elsworthy has been selected due to her strong performances at the Australian Junior Championships and in the South Australian Premier League with the North Adelaide Rockets.

References

1998 births
Living people
Guards (basketball)
Adelaide Lightning players
Australian women's basketball players
Basketball players from Adelaide
20th-century Australian women
21st-century Australian women